Perryton Independent School District is a public school district based in Perryton, Texas (USA). It also serves Waka.

In 2009, the school district was rated "academically acceptable" by the Texas Education Agency.

History

On September 9, 1990, the district absorbed the Waka Independent School District.

Schools
Perryton High School (Grades 9-12)
Perryton Junior High (Grades 6-8)
Edwin F. Williams Intermediate (Grades 4-5)
James L. Wright Elementary (Grades 1-3)
2004 National Blue Ribbon School
Perryton Kinder (Grades PK-K)

References

External links
Perryton ISD

School districts in Ochiltree County, Texas